Mīān Muhammad Bakhsh (میاں محمد بخش) was a  Punjabi Muslim Sufi and poet. Born in the city of Mirpur to a Gujjar family of Poswal tribe, he is renowned as a great poet and Sufi scholar by the people of Punjab and Azad Kashmir. Writing some 18 different books during his lifetime of 77 years, Muhammad Baksh is especially remembered for his romantic epic Saiful Maluk and the romantic tragedy Mirza Sahiban. Most of his work is in Punjabi and its dialect Pothwari, with the exception of the book Yari, written in Farsi.

Lineage
Mian Muhammad Bakhsh belonged to a Punjabi Gujjar family of the Paswal clan with roots in Jhelum, Punjab

Dispute about date of birth
There is considerable disagreement about his year of birth. Mahbūb 'Alī Faqīr Qādirī, in a biography printed as an appendix to the text of Sayful Mulūk gives the date as 1246 AH (1830 AD), a date also followed by the Shāhkār Islāmī Encyclopedia; 1830 and 1843 are suggested in other works. Mīān Muhammad Bakhsh himself states in his magnum opus, Sayful Mulūk, that he completed the work in the month of Ramadan, 1279 AH (1863 AD), and that he was then thirty-three years of age. Hence, he must have been born in 1829 or 1830.

Upbringing
He was brought up in a very religious environment, and received his early education at home. He was later sent with his elder brother, Mīān Bahāval, to the nearby village of Samwal Sharīf to study religious sciences, especially the science of Hadith in the madrassah of Hāfiz Muhammad 'Alī. His teacher was Hāfiz Ghulam Hussain. Hāfiz Muhammad 'Alī had a brother, Hāfiz Nāsir, who was a majzub, and had renounced worldly matters; this dervish resided at that time in the mosque at Samwal Sharīf. From childhood Mīān Muhammad had exhibited a penchant for poetry, and was especially fond of reading Yūsuf ō Zulaikhā by Nur ad-Din Abd ar-Rahman Jami. During his time at the madrassah, Hāfiz Nāsir would often beg him to sing some lines from Jami's poetry, and upon hearing it so expertly rendered would invariably fall into a state of spiritual intoxication.

Mīān Muhammad was still only fifteen years old when his father, falling seriously ill, and realizing that he was on his deathbed, called all his students and local notaries to see him. Mīān Shamsuddīn told his visitors that it was his duty to pass on the spiritual lineage that he had received through his family from Pīr-e Shāh Ghāzī Qalandar Damriyan Wali Sarkar; he pointed to his own son, Mīān Muhammad, and told those assembled that he could find nobody more suitable than he to whom he might award this privilege. Everybody agreed, the young man's reputation had already spread far and wide. Mīān Muhammad, however, spoke up and disagreed, saying that he could not bear to stand by and allow his elder brother Bahāvul to be deprived of the honour. The old man was filled with so much love for his son that he stood up and leaving his bed grasped his son by the arms; he led him to one corner and made him face the approximate direction of Baghdad, and then he addressed the founder of their Sufi Order, Shaikh Abdul Qadir Gilani, presenting his son to him as his spiritual successor. Shortly after this incident his father died. Mīān Muhammad continued to reside in his family home for a further four years, then at the age of nineteen he moved into the khānqāh, where he remained for the rest of his life. Both his brothers combined both religion and worldly affairs in their lives, but he was only interested in spirituality, and never married unlike them.

Formal pledge of allegiance
Despite the fact that he had essentially been made a khalīfah of his father, he realized that he still needed to make a formal pledge of allegiance or bay'ah to a Sufi master. Having completed his formal education he began to travel, seeking out deserted locations where he would busy himself in prayer and spiritual practices, shunning the company of his fellow-men. He took the Sufi pledge of allegiance or bay'ah with Ghulām Muhammad, who was the khalīfah of Bābā Badūh Shāh Abdāl, the khalīfah of Hājī Bagāsher (of Darkālī Mamuri Sharīf, near Kallar Syedan District Rawalpindi), the khalīfah again of Dumriyan Wali Sarkar. He is also said to have travelled for a while to Srinagar, where he benefitted greatly from Shaikh Ahmad Valī.

Poetic talents and works
Once he had advanced a little along the Sufi way, he became more and more interested in composing poetry, and one of the first things he penned was a qasidah (quatrain) in praise of his spiritual guide. His poetry is written in a mixed language composed of the Majhi, Potohari and Hindko dialects of Punjabi, and utilizes a rich vocabulary of Persian and Arabic loan-words. Mian Muhammad Bakhsh, in his lifetime, contributed his great mystic thought in the language of the masses – Punjabi language which was also his mother tongue.

His works include: Siharfi, Sohni Mahiwal, Tuhfah-e Miran, Tuhfah-e- Rasuliyah, Shirin Farhad, Mirza Sahiban, Sakhi Khavass Khan, Shah Mansur, Gulzar-e Faqir, Hidayatul Muslimin, Panj Ganj, Masnavi-e Nīrang-e ‘Ishq. He also wrote a commentary on the Arabic Qasidat al-Burda of al-Busiri and his most famous work, entitled Safarul ‘Ishq (Journey of Love), but better known as Saif ul Maluk.

Death and legacy
He died on the 7th day of the Islamic month of Dhu al-Hijjah 1324 AH (1907 AD), and was buried in Khari Sharif, not far away from his spiritual great great grandfather, Damriyan Wali Sarkar. To this day many people visit his tomb with the intention of receiving spiritual blessings.

In February 2016, rich tributes were paid to Mian Muhammad Bakhsh at a literary seminar held at Allama Iqbal Open University, Islamabad, Pakistan. Speakers at the seminar included scholar Fateh Muhammad Malik. He said that Mian Muhammad Bakhsh, through his poetry, spread the message of mutual harmony and brotherhood of mankind. He added that the young generation should seek aspirations from the national heroes and eminent literary personalities like him. Mian Muhammad Bakhsh serves as a guiding force to develop a happy and successful life.

References

External links

 Full text of Saiful Malūk poetry of Mian Muhammad Bakhsh
 Kalam of Mian Muhammad Bakhsh on YouTube

1830 births
1907 deaths
Sufi poets
Punjabi people
People from British India
Punjabi-language poets
19th-century poets
Punjabi Sufi saints
Sufi shrines in Pakistan
Mystic poets